Real Football  is a mobile phone sports video game franchise with gameplay emulating  football. The series is developed and published by Gameloft. The Real Football series started in the mid 2000s with Real Football 2004, which was free on some mobile phones. As of 2016, a new installment of the series has been published every year. The games feature both national teams and local clubs, and allow the player to play in various "real-life" cups. Real Football 2008 was the first in the series to be published on more than just mobile phones, as a Nintendo DS version was also produced. Real Football 2009 added an iOS version, and expanded the team lineup. Real Football 2012 added an Android version. Real Football 2018 was the last game in the series to be released on Java ME.

Games
Real Football 2004
Real Football 2005
Real Football 2006
Real Football 2007
Real Football 2008
Real Football 2009
Real Football Manager 2009
Real Football 2010
Real Football: Manager Edition 2010
Real Football 2011
Real Football 2012
Real Football 2013
Real Football Manager 2013
Real Football 2014
Real Football 2015
Real Football 2016
Real Football 2017
Real Football 2018
Real Football 2019
Real Football 2020
Real Football 2021
Real Football 2022

References 

 
 
 
 
 
 

Gameloft games
Vivendi franchises
Association football video games